Chasseral Pass (el. 1502 m.) is a high mountain pass in the Jura Mountains, lying west of the Chasseral. The pass is located on the border between the Swiss cantons of Neuchâtel (north side) and Bern (south side). It is traversed by a road connecting Saint-Imier and Nods, both located in the Bernese Jura. North-east of the pass is the Chasseral Ouest, the highest point of the canton of Neuchâtel.

From the summit of the pass another road leads to the Chasseral hotel (1,548 m) and summit of the Chasseral (1,607 m).

Weather

See also
 List of highest paved roads in Europe
 List of mountain passes
List of the highest Swiss passes

References

External links
Swisscom tower

Mountain passes of Switzerland
Mountain passes of the Jura
Mountain passes of the canton of Bern
Mountain passes of the canton of Neuchâtel
Bern–Neuchâtel border